William Binnie may refer to:
William Binnie (minister) (1823–1886), Scottish Presbyterian minister, academic and author
William Binnie (architect) (1886–1963), Scottish architect
William Binnie (engineer) (1867–1949), British civil engineer
William Harrison Binnie (born 1958), New Hampshire industrialist and investment banker
Ian Binnie (William Ian Corneil Binnie, born 1939), puisne justice of the Supreme Court of Canada
Brian Binnie (William Brian Binnie, born 1953), former United States Navy officer